Kevin Bramble  (born September 19, 1972) is an American disabled ski racer, freeskier, and monoski designer/builder from the Cape May Court House section of Middle Township, New Jersey, United States.  He competes as a monoskier in the LW 12-1 class and is known as a "speed specialist," preferring to compete in downhill and super G.

Career
Bramble grew up in New Jersey and began skiing recreationally in Pennsylvania's Poconos at age 11. By 1994, he was a serious snowboarder and occasional skier living in the Lake Tahoe area when he became paralyzed in a snowboarding accident. He soon taught himself to monoski and moved to Winter Park, Colorado, where he joined the Winter Park Disabled Ski Team. He returned to the Tahoe area soon after, settling in Truckee, California, but having acquired the racing skills that he needed. He was named to the U.S. Disabled Ski Team in 1998 after winning the super G at that year's U.S. Disabled Alpine Championships.

Since 1998, Bramble has had an on-and-off relationship with the U.S. Ski Team, often competing in World Cup competition but eschewing traditional race training in favor of freeskiing with friends at Squaw Valley, California. His greatest success has come in downhill, beginning with a World Cup win on the Paralympic course at Snowbasin, Utah in 2001. A year later, Bramble was the odds-on favorite to win the downhill gold at the 2002 Winter Paralympics in Salt Lake City, Utah, and he did not disappoint, beating teammate Chris Devlin-Young by just 0.17 seconds. Two years later at the Disabled Alpine Skiing World Championships in Wildschönau, Austria, he again won gold in downhill, defeating Germany's Thomas Mayer by an astonishing 1.44 seconds. Two years later at the 2006 Winter Paralympics in Torino, Italy, the pressure was on Bramble to win his third straight major world downhill championship. Once again Bramble proved his dominance, again knocking teammate Devlin-Young down to the silver-medal position with a wild run that won him the gold by nearly a full second.

Bramble has made a reputation for himself not only as a racer but also as a freeskier. One of the first people to take a monoski into terrain parks, halfpipes, and extreme terrain, Bramble and teammate Monte Meier are featured in Warren Miller's 2006 ski movie Off the Grid.

Monoski manufacturer
After several years skiing in a monoski he had purchased, Bramble decided to design and build his own. After several prototypes resulted in a model he was satisfied with, he began hand-building monoskis for friends and teammates, and Kevin Bramble Goodz (KBG) was born. After operating the business out of his garage in Truckee for several years, Bramble relocated back to his home town of Cape May Court House, New Jersey, in 2004 so his family could help him run the business. Seven out of the 10 current U.S. Disabled Ski Team monoskiers ski in KBG monoskis. Bramble also builds his own unique, three-wheeled wheelchairs and has plans to launch a downhill mountain-bike wheelchair soon.

References

1972 births
American male alpine skiers
People from Middle Township, New Jersey
Living people
Paralympic alpine skiers of the United States
Alpine skiers at the 2002 Winter Paralympics
Alpine skiers at the 2006 Winter Paralympics
Paralympic gold medalists for the United States
Medalists at the 2006 Winter Paralympics
Medalists at the 2002 Winter Paralympics
Medalists at the 2010 Winter Paralympics
X Games athletes
Paralympic medalists in alpine skiing